North of Nome is a 1936 American drama film directed by William Nigh and starring Jack Holt, Evelyn Venable and Guinn 'Big Boy' Williams.

Cast
 Jack Holt as John Raglan  
 Evelyn Venable as Camilla Bridle  
 Guinn 'Big Boy' Williams as Haage  
 John Miljan as Dawson  
 Roger Imhof as Judge Bridle 
 Dorothy Appleby as Ruby 
 Paul Hurst as Carlson  
 Frank McGlynn Sr. as U. S. Marshal  
 Robert Gleckler as Bruno  
 Ben Hendricks Jr. as Grail  
 George Cleveland as Ship Captain  
 Miki Morita as Sato  
 Chief Blackhawk as Eskimo Hunter

References

Bibliography
 Hardy, Phil, The Encyclopedia of Western Movies. Octopus, 1983.

External links
 

1936 films
1936 drama films
American drama films
Films directed by William Nigh
Columbia Pictures films
American black-and-white films
1930s English-language films
1930s American films